The Ingalkoyyu or Isawaghan people are a Northern Songhay ethnic group around In-Gall in Niger. They speak Tasawaq, 
a Northern Songhay dialect.

References

Ethnic groups in Niger